Kurtwood Larson Smith (born July 3, 1943) is an American television and film actor. He is known for playing Clarence Boddicker in RoboCop (1987), Robert Griggs in Rambo III (1988), and Red Forman in That '70s Show (1998–2006) and That '90s Show (2023-), as well as for his many appearances in science fiction films and television programs (Lou Grant, Star Trek, The X-Files). He also starred in the seventh season of 24. He voiced Gene on Regular Show (2012–2017), Leslie Claret on Patriot (2015–2018), and Old Man Peterson on The Ranch (2017–2020).

Early life
Smith was born in New Lisbon, Wisconsin, the son of Mabel Annette Lund (née Larson) and George Smith. Smith's mother was a fan of a country singer named Kurt (or Curt) in the early 1940s. However, she thought "Kurt Smith" was too short a name, so she added "wood" ("she just tacked it on to the end", he said); Smith has said that he is likely the only Kurtwood. According to an interview with Smith on Caroline Rhea's syndicated television show Smith's father was a Major during the Second World War and was killed in Europe.

Smith grew up in the San Fernando Valley and graduated from Canoga Park High School in Canoga Park, California in 1961; Smith graduated from San Jose State College (now San José State University) in 1965 with a B.A. and Stanford University in 1969 with an M.F.A.

Career
On stage, Smith won three Drama-Logue Awards for his performances in Billy Budd, Idiot's Delight, and Green Grow the Lilacs. In his film career, he portrayed Clarence Boddicker in Paul Verhoeven's science fiction film RoboCop and the father role as Red Forman on the Fox sitcom That '70s Show, which ran from 1998 to 2006. After That '70s Show ended, Smith played Senator Blaine Mayer in the seventh season of the action thriller 24, and portrayed Dick Clayton in the CBS series Worst Week. He enjoyed a recurring role as a rogue FBI agent in Seasons 3–5 of the NBC (later CBS) series Medium, appearing in later episodes as a ghost after his character's death. He played the main character Henry Langston in the ABC sci-fi/drama Resurrection which ran for two seasons (2014–15). He was a regular on the Amazon original dramedy series Patriot (2015-2018). In 2023, he reprised the role of Red Forman in That '90s Show, a sequel series of That '70s Show.

His other roles included playing the leader of the Ku Klux Klan, Stump Sisson, in A Time to Kill. He also played the role of Mr. Sue on Fox's "espionage comedy" The New Adventures of Beans Baxter in 1987. He also starred as the strict father of Robert Sean Leonard's Neil in 1989's Dead Poets Society. He made a number of appearances in the Star Trek franchise, playing the President of the Federation in Star Trek VI: The Undiscovered Country, a Cardassian named Thrax in the Star Trek: Deep Space Nine episode "Things Past", and a Krenim scientist named Annorax in the Star Trek: Voyager two-part episode "Year of Hell".

He also has an extensive voice acting résumé, appearing in computer games such as Fallout Tactics: Brotherhood of Steel, and FreeSpace 2, and on a number of animated series. He played a recurring role on the claymation series Gary & Mike as the vengeful Officer Dick and voiced the dinosaurian military commander character General Galapagos in the Savage Steve Holland produced Fox animated series Terrible Thunderlizards. He played the voice of Bob Johnson on Squirrel Boy and provided the voice of Kanjar Ro in Green Lantern: First Flight and starred as the sheriff in Last of the Dogmen. Smith appeared on the Netflix series The Ranch as Mr. Peterson, a farmer dying of brain cancer. Smith worked in the stop-motion AMC+ series Ultra City Smiths where he voiced Carpenter K. Smith.

Filmography

Film

Television

Video games

References

External links

 
 
 

1943 births
Living people
20th-century American male actors
21st-century American male actors
American male film actors
American male television actors
American male voice actors
College of San Mateo alumni
Male actors from California
Male actors from Wisconsin
People from New Lisbon, Wisconsin
People from Glendale, California
People from the San Fernando Valley
San Jose State University alumni
Stanford University alumni